Sumaiyya Bukhsh is Pakistani actress and model. She is known for her roles in dramas such as Kam Zarf, Main Agar Chup Hoon, Inteqam, Noor-e-Zindagi and Be Rehem.

Early life
Sumaiyya was born on July 20, 1998 in Karachi, Pakistan and she completed her studies from University of Karachi.

Career
She made her debut as an actress in 2016 on Geo TV. She did a supporting role in drama Noor-e-Zindagi as Mano and Rishtay Kachay Dhagoon Se as Hareem . In 2017 she did a lead role in drama Jalti Barish as Sarwat an innocent girl, she was praised for her natural acting and expressions. In 2018 she did three lead roles in dramas, she played as Hina with Rizwan Ali Jaffri in drama Mera Ghar Aur Ghardari who gets mistreated by her husband's first wife. She played lead role along with Omer Shahzad in Be Rehem drama as Ashi, who is abused and tortured by her husband and her paring with Omer Shahzad became popular. She also played lead role in drama Rabbaway as Zeerat an innocent girl who wishes to marry her lover. She also did modeling for designers, magazines, commercials and advertisements. In 2019 she played lead role as Hania in Mera Kiya Qasoor as a victim daughter who is mistreated by her father, in the same year she appeared in drama Kam Zarf as Mona the youngest sibling who wants to see her elder sister happy, she also played lead role as Maha in drama Soya Mera Naseeb.

Filmography

Television

Telefilm

References

External links
 
 
 

1998 births
Living people
Pakistani television actresses
21st-century Pakistani actresses